In physiology, diastasis is the middle stage of diastole during the cycle of a heartbeat, where the initial passive filling of the heart's ventricles has slowed, but before the atria contract to complete the active filling.
Diastasis is the longest phase of cardiac cycle.

See also
 Compare diastasis (pathology)

References

Medical terminology